LLM may refer to:

Master of Laws, a postgraduate degree
LLM Communications, a defunct lobbying firm
LLM Lettering, a typeface
Large language model, the use of large neural networks for language modeling
Logic learning machine, a machine learning method